Kentucky Route 376 (KY 376) is a  state highway in the U.S. state of Kentucky. The highway connects mostly rural areas of Breckinridge and Meade counties with Payneville.

Route description
KY 376 begins at an intersection with KY 144 in Frymire, within Breckinridge County. It travels to the northeast and enters Meade County. It intersects the northern terminus of KY 477 (Hardesty–Raymond Road). It curves to the east-northeast and intersects the northern terminus of KY 2734 (New State Road). It curves to the north-northeast and enters Payneville, where it meets its northern terminus, a second intersection with KY 144 (Payneville Road).

Major intersections

See also

References

0376
Transportation in Breckinridge County, Kentucky
Transportation in Meade County, Kentucky